Shah Nawaz Bhutto Colony is a neighborhood in the Karachi Central district of Karachi, Pakistan. It is administered as part of New Karachi Town,.

Political History  
Shah Nawaz Bhutto Colony is UC-1 of New Karachi Town, which comprises on sector 1, Sector 2 & Sector 3 of North Karachi. Currently Sajid Hasan of JIP is the chairman of and Syed Muhammad Kashif of JIP is the vice chairman of this UC.

2023 Election
1st Position JIP
2nd Position PPP

2015 Election
1st Position MQM
2nd Position JIP

2005 Election
1st Position MQM
2nd Position JIP

2001 Election
1st Position JIP
2nd Position PPP

There are several ethnic groups in Shah Nawaz Bhutto Colony. Predominantly Muhajirs including Panjabi Awan Sindhis, Kashmiris, Seraikis, Pakhtuns, Balochis, Memons, Bohras,  Ismailis, etc. Over 99% of the population is Muslim. The population of New Karachi Town is estimated to be nearly one million.

References

External links 
 Karachi Website.

Neighbourhoods of Karachi
New Karachi Town
Karachi Central District
Mohammad Ajmal Raza Saeedi →